The Levant is a region in the eastern Mediterranean, including the Southern Levant.

Levant may also refer to:

Places
Levant Island, a French island in the Mediterranean
Levant, Kansas, an unincorporated community in Thomas County, Kansas, USA
Levant, Maine, a town in Penobscot County, Maine, USA
Islamic State of Iraq and the Levant (ISIL), also known as ISIS and Daesh.

Surname
Alma Levant Hayden (1927–1967), born Alma Levant, American chemist
Brian Levant (born 1952), American film and television producer, director, and writer
Ezra Levant (born 1972), Canadian political commentator
Jack LeVant (born 1999), American freestyle swimmer
Kate Levant (born 1983), American sculptor and conceptual artist
Oscar Levant (1906–1972), American musician, author, and actor

Fictional characters
Levant, protagonist of the video game Jade Cocoon: Story of the Tamamayu
Levant, one of the main characters in the video game Hexyz Force

Ships
HMS Levant (1758), a 28-gun sixth rate launched in 1758 and broken up by 1780
HMS Levant (1813), a 20-gun sixth rate launched in 1813
USS Levant (1837), sloop-of-war in the United States Navy (1837–1860)

Other uses
Levant (wind), a wind in eastern Spain and southern France
The Levant (poem), an epic poem by Mircea Cărtărescu
Levant Company, an English company formed to trade with the Middle East
Levant Herald, a bilingual newspaper published in the Ottoman Empire
Levant Mine and Beam Engine, an engine at a tin mine on the western coast of Cornwall
Levant sparrowhawk, bird of prey
Levant, an academic journal published by the Council for British Research in the Levant
Morocco leather, also known as Levant, a soft, pliable form of leather 
Levant, the eastern tower of the Les Mercuriales twin towers in Paris, France

See also
Levante (disambiguation)
Levanter (disambiguation)
Levantine (disambiguation)
Levent (name)
Levente (disambiguation)